The Singapore Open was a golf tournament in Singapore that was predominantly part of the Asian Tour schedule. The event was held at Sentosa Golf Club since 2005 and since 2017 had been part of the Open Qualifying Series, giving up to four non-exempt players entry into The Open Championship.

The Singapore Open was founded in 1961 and was one of the tournaments on the first season of the Far East Circuit (later the Asia Golf Circuit) the following year. It remained part of the Asia circuit until 1993 when it became a fixture on the Australasian Tour. After just 3 seasons, it left the Australasian Tour to join the fledgling Asian Tour for that tour's second season in 1996. The event was also co-sanctioned with the European Tour from 2009 to 2012, and with the Japan Golf Tour since 2016.

History
The Singapore Open was founded in 1961 and was staged annually until 2001, when it was won by Thaworn Wiratchant. Other winners in the years leading up to this included American Shaun Micheel in 1998, who went on to win the 2003 PGA Championship. Other notable winners of the event who went on to win majors, include Ángel Cabrera, Adam Scott and Sergio García.

In 2002 the event was cancelled because of lack of sponsorship. It was not revived until 2005, when sponsorship was secured from the Sentosa Leisure Group. The 2005 prize fund was $2 million, which made the Singapore Open by far the richest tournament exclusive to the Asian Tour that was not co-sanctioned by the European Tour, a status it retained until the European Tour first co-sanctioned the event in 2009. Asian Tour chief executive Louis Martin claimed when the revival of the tournament was announced, "Competing for a prize purse of two million US dollars will give our playing membership a huge boost and elevate the Asian Tour to a new level." The 2005 event was played in September.

The 2006 Singapore Open offered a purse of US$3 million with a winner's share of US$475,000. In May 2006, it was announced that Barclays Bank would sponsor the event for five years from 2006 and that the prize fund will be increased to US$4 million in 2007 and US$5 million in 2008. In 2011, the purse was US$6,000,000. The 2013 edition was cancelled due to lack of sponsorship.

After a three-year absence, the tournament returned in January 2016. The event was co-sanctioned by the Asian Tour and Japan Golf Tour. Sumitomo Mitsui Banking Corporation also became the new title sponsor of the event. Song Young-han won the revived event, beating current world number one Jordan Spieth by one shot in the weather-delayed event.

Matt Kuchar won the 2020 event, beating Justin Rose by three shots.

The tournament was not played in 2021 due to the COVID-19 pandemic.

Venues
The following venues have been used since the founding of the Singapore Open in 1961.

Winners

See also
Singapore Masters – a golf tournament which was co-sanctioned by the Asian and European Tours from 2001 to 2007

Notes

References

External links
Official site
Coverage on the Asian Tour's official site
Coverage on the Japan Golf Tour's official site
Coverage on the European Tour's official site (2009–2012)

Asia Golf Circuit events
Former Asian Tour events
Former Japan Golf Tour events
Former European Tour events
Former PGA Tour of Australasia events
Golf tournaments in Singapore
Recurring sporting events established in 1961
1961 establishments in Singapore
Sumitomo Mitsui Financial Group